The Martin Short Show is an American sitcom television series created by Paul Flaherty, Michael Short, and star Martin Short, that aired on NBC from September 15 until September 27, 1994 on NBC.

Overview
The series focuses on Marty Short, a comedian who tries to balance his work life as a sketch show host, and his home life with his wife and children.

Cast 
Martin Short - Marty Short
Jan Hooks - Meg Harper Short
Noley Thornton - Caroline Short
Zack Duhame - Charlie Short
Andrea Martin - Alice Manoogan
Brian Doyle-Murray - Gary

Episodes

External links
 

1990s American sitcoms
NBC original programming
Television series by Universal Television
English-language television shows
1994 American television series debuts
1994 American television series endings